Bridgeport is a town in Caddo County, Oklahoma, United States. The population was 116 at the 2010 census.

History
Bridgeport was so named on account of there being a toll bridge over the Canadian River at that point.

Geography
It is bordered to the north by Blaine County. The town is built on the south side of the valley of the Canadian River, overlooking its floodplain.

Demographics

As of the census of 2000, there were 109 people, 42 households, and 30 families residing in the city. The racial makeup of the city was 89.91% White, 0.92% Native American, 1.83% Asian, and 7.34% from two or more races.

There were 42 households, out of which 28.6% had children under the age of 18 living with them, 47.6% were married couples living together, 14.3% had a female householder with no husband present, and 26.2% were non-families. 23.8% of all households were made up of individuals, and 9.5% had someone living alone who was 65 years of age or older. The average household size was 2.60 and the average family size was 3.10.

In the city, the population was spread out, with 24.8% under the age of 18, 6.4% from 18 to 24, 28.4% from 25 to 44, 22.9% from 45 to 64, and 17.4% who were 65 years of age or older. The median age was 38 years. For every 100 females, there were 94.6 males. For every 100 females age 18 and over, there were 105.0 males.

The median income for a household in the city was $18,906, and the median income for a family was $23,333. Males had a median income of $27,500 versus $11,250 for females. The per capita income for the city was $11,380. There were 16.7% of families and 19.4% of the population living below the poverty line, including no under eighteens and 21.6% of those over 64.

Transportation
The town is just north of the old US Route 66, and further north from Interstate 40.

Bridgeport is served by Hinton Municipal Airport (FAA ID: 2O8), which is about 5 miles southeast and features a 4001 x 60 ft. (1220 x 18 m) paved runway.

Commercial air transportation is available at Will Rogers World Airport, about 58 miles to the east-southeast.

Bridgeport is on its own 9.6-mile branch of the AT&L Railroad that runs to Geary, Oklahoma, and on from there to El Reno, Oklahoma, with the AT&L then having overhead trackage rights on Union Pacific to Oklahoma City.  Traffic includes grain, fertilizer and agriculture-related products.

References

Towns in Caddo County, Oklahoma
Towns in Oklahoma